Wendt & Kühn KG is a manufacturer of painted wooden figures and music boxes in the Ore Mountain tradition that have become collectible. All their products are produced by hand and only made in the German federal state of Saxony. The best known figures are the Grünhainichen angels, with their characteristic green wings and their eleven white dots, and the flower children.

The company was founded in 1915 by Grete Wendt (1887-1979) and Margarete Kühn. Today the firm is in the hands of the Wendt family. Their range currently comprises about 400 figures. The company's headquarters is in Grünhainichen in Saxony. The firm employs 155 workers, of which about 80 are figure painters and 4 painters who are especially responsible for the faces of the figures.

Sources 
 Ehrhardt Heinold: Himmlische Boten aus dem Erzgebirge. Die weltberühmten Engel von Wendt & Kühn. ("Heavenly Messengers from the Ore Mountains. The World-Famous Angels of Wendt & Kühn."), 2nd ed., Husum 2008

External links 
 

Companies based in Saxony
Toy companies of Germany
Manufacturing companies established in 1915
German companies established in 1915
Toy companies established in 1915